Stephen Edward Kimber (born August 25, 1949) is a Canadian journalist, editor and broadcaster and professor at the University of King's College in Halifax, Nova Scotia.

Early life and education
Kimber was born in Halifax, Nova Scotia. He attended Dalhousie University from 1967 to 1970, where he served as editor of the Dalhousie Gazette. He earned his Master of Fine Arts in Creative Nonfiction from Goucher College in Baltimore in 2001.

Career 
From 1985 to 2002 he was the weekly political and general columnist for The Daily News in Halifax. He is currently a weekly political and public affairs columnist for the Halifax Examiner and a Contributing Editor for Atlantic Business Magazine. His writing has appeared in many major Canadian newspapers and magazines. As an Ottawa-based broadcaster, he was a current affairs producer on CTV Television Network and a producer, story editor, writer and host for many CBC Television and radio programs.

He has been a professor at The University of King's College since 1983 and has been the director of the School of Journalism three times. In 2013, he co-founded the university's Master of Fine Arts in Creative Nonfiction program.

Honors

Kimber received an honorable mention from the Centre for Investigative Journalism that he shared with Kelly Shiers for an article in Cities Magazine about the botched search for a little boy lost in the woods of Nova Scotia.

Books 
 Net Profits (Nimbus, 1990)
 The Spirit of Africville (co-author) (Formac, 1992)
 More Than Just Folks (Pottersfield, 1996)
 Flight 111: The Tragedy of the Swissair Crash (Doubleday, 1999/ Nimbus 2013)
 NOT GUILTY: The Trial of Gerald Regan (Stoddart, 1999) 
 Aphrodisiac: Sex, Politics, Power and Gerald Regan. (Expanded and updated ebook edition, 2016)
 Sailors, Slackers and Blind Pigs: Halifax at War (Doubleday, September 2002);
 Winner, Richardson Award (2003)
 Winner, Dartmouth Book Award for Nonfiction (2003)
 Torgi Award, CNIB Nonfiction Audio Book Award (2004)
 Finalist, Atlantic Booksellers Award (2003)
 Reparations: A Novel (HarperCollins 2006)
 Finalist, Dartmouth Book Award for Fiction (2006)
 Finalist Arthur Ellis Crime Writers of Canada First Novel Award
 Loyalists and Layabouts: The Rapid Rise and Faster Fall of Shelburne, NS 1783-1792 (Doubleday 2008);
 Finalist, Richardson Award (2008)
 Finalist, Dartmouth Book Award for Nonfiction
 IWK: A Century of Caring (Nimbus, 2009)
 Halifax: Warden of the North (co-author, updated edition) (Nimbus 2010)
 What Lies Across the Water: The Real Story of the Cuban Five (Fernwood, 2013)
 Winner, Richardson Award (2014)
 Long-listed, Libris Award for Best Canadian Nonfiction Book (2014)
 Readers Choice Award, Cuban Institute of the Book (Spanish edition, 2016)
 The Sweetness in the Lime (Nimbus, 2020)
 Alexa!: Changing the Face of Canadian Politics (Goose Lane, 2021)
 Bitcoin Widow: Love, Betrayal and the Missing Millions (Jennifer Robertson with Stephen Kimber) (HarperCollins Canada, 2022)

References

External links 
 Stephen Kimber Official Website.
 Twitter 
 University of King's College Profile 
 Facebook

Canadian newspaper journalists
Living people
1949 births
Journalists from Nova Scotia
People from Halifax, Nova Scotia
Academic staff of University of King's College
Dalhousie University alumni
Goucher College alumni
Centre for Investigative Journalism Award winners